Helicops modestus, the olive keelback, is a species of snake in the family Colubridae. It is found in Brazil.

References 

Helicops]
Snakes of South America
Endemic fauna of Brazil
Reptiles of Brazil
Reptiles described in 1861
Taxa named by Albert Günther